Meizhou–Chaoshan high-speed railway, a passenger-dedicated line (PDL), opened for revenue service on 11 October 2019, connecting two principal cities in Guangdong province, Meizhou and Chaoshan.

The line starts from a new Meizhou West railway station in the north, passes through Meizhou, Jieyang and Chaozhou connecting with Xiamen–Shenzhen railway and the Shantou line at Chaoshan.

Meizhou–Chaoshan high-speed rail is a joint initiative of the China Railway Corporation and Guangdong Provincial Government, its construction required an estimated investment of 14.5 billion yuan. Under construction since 2014, the line has intermediate stations at, Shejiang North, Jianqiao, Fengshun East, Jieyang and Jieyang Airport.

In September 2019 there were 20 arrivals and departures from Meizhou West railway station, the departures were:

 4 G-series trains:
 16 D-series trains:

Chaoshan railway station has a wider variety of trains and destinations being both the terminus of this line and an intermediate station on the Xiamen–Shenzhen railway. The intermediate stations have a lower level of service with some of the trains stopping at some of the stations, for example Shejiang North station has only three departures per day in each direction.

References

High-speed railway lines in China
Rail transport in Guangdong
Railway lines opened in 2019
Airport rail links in China